"The Offshore Pirate" is a short story written by F. Scott Fitzgerald in 1920. It is one of eight short stories included in Fitzgerald's first published collection, Flappers and Philosophers. The story was first published in the May 29, 1920 issue of The Saturday Evening Post and illustrated by Leslie L. Benson. The story was Fitzgerald's third appearance in the magazine that month. It demonstrates his rapid development as a versatile fiction writer. It is the first story that develops Fitzgerald's recurrent plot idea of a heroine won by her lover's performance of an extraordinary deed.

Plot summary 

The story is about Ardita Farnam, she is on a trip to Florida. Her boat is eventually captured by pirates, she falls in love with their captain. The story had originally ended with the weak explanation that it was all Ardita's dream. Fitzgerald rewrote the conclusion to emphasize the reality of the story: "The last line takes Lorimer [the editor of the Post] at his word.  It is one of the best lines I've ever written."

Publication history 
The story was first published in the May 29, 1920 issue of The Saturday Evening Post, his third short story appearance in the magazine that month. The story was republished in the short story collection Flappers and Philosophers.

Adaptations 
The story was adapted to film as The Off-Shore Pirate in 1921, which starred Viola Dana as Ardita.

In 2010 an operatic version by Joel Weiss premiered at Christopher Street Opera in New York City.

References

Citations

Works cited

External links 

 
 The Saturday Evening Post — "The Offshore Pirate" (HathiTrust)

Short stories by F. Scott Fitzgerald
1920 short stories
1920s short stories
Short stories adapted into films
Works originally published in The Saturday Evening Post